Lycus sanguinipennis is a species of net-winged beetle in the family Lycidae. It is found in North America.

There are currently 26 known Lucus sanguinipennis beetles:

12 in Arizona, United States

2 in New Mexico, United States

7 in Colorado, United States

2 in Puebla, Mexico

References

Further reading

 

Lycidae
Articles created by Qbugbot
Beetles described in 1823